El Rey de los exhortos is a 1979 Argentine film directed by Hugo Sofovich.

Cast
Alberto Olmedo	 ... 	Dr. Alberto Benavidez
Susana Giménez	... 	Susana Lezama
Fernando Siro	... 	Ing. Julio Castromil
Mabel Manzotti	... 	Felisa
Rudy Chernicoff	... 	Detective
Elena Sedova
Constanza Maral
Augusto Larreta	... 	Juez
María Rosa Fugazot	... 	Hilda
César Bertrand	... 	Luis
Carmen Barbieri	... 	Norma

External links
 

1979 films
1970s Spanish-language films
1970s sex comedy films
Argentine sex comedy films
Films directed by Hugo Sofovich
1979 comedy films
1970s Argentine films